Edgar Franke (born 21 January 1960) is a German politician of the Social Democratic Party (SPD) who has been serving as a member of the Bundestag from the state of Hesse since 2009. In addition to his parliamentary work, he has been serving as Parliamentary State Secretary at the Federal Ministry of Health in the government of Chancellor Olaf Scholz since 2021.

Early life and education 
After graduating from the Albert-Schweitzer-School in Kassel and his civilian service with the district association of the Arbeiterwohlfahrt in Kassel, Franke studied political science and law in Marburg and Gießen. He passed the 1st state examination in law at the Justus-Liebig-University in Gießen and the 2nd state examination in law at the regional court in Kassel.

Political career 
Franke first became a member of the Bundestag in the 2009 German federal election, representing the Schwalm-Eder district. He is a member of the Committee on Health, which he chaired from 2014 until 2017. He also served as a member of the Committee on Legal Affairs from 2009 until 2016.

In addition to his committee assignments, Franke has been co-chairing the German-Iranian Parliamentary Friendship Group since 2018.

Within his parliamentary group, Franke belongs to the Seeheim Circle.

Other activities
 Kurt Schumacher Society, Member of the Board
 German United Services Trade Union (ver.di), Member

References

External links 

  
 Bundestag biography 

1960 births
Living people
Members of the Bundestag for Hesse
Members of the Bundestag 2021–2025
Members of the Bundestag 2017–2021
Members of the Bundestag 2013–2017
Members of the Bundestag 2009–2013
Members of the Bundestag for the Social Democratic Party of Germany